Duchâtel or du Châtel or du Chastel is a French surname. It may refer to:

 François Duchatel or du Chastel (1616–1694), Flemish painter
 Guigues du Chastel (1083–1136), Carthusian monk and 5th prior of Grande Chartreuse monastery in the 12th century
 Marie Duchatel or du Chastel (died 1692), painter from the Southern Netherlands
 Tanneguy Duchâtel (1803–1867, Paris), French politician, Minister of the Interior in the July Monarchy
 Tanneguy du Chastel (or Tanguy du Châtel) (1369–1449), Breton military leader of the Hundred Years' War